Jaedyn Reese Shaw (born November 20, 2004) is an American professional soccer player who plays as a forward or attacking midfielder for San Diego Wave FC in the National Women's Soccer League (NWSL) and the United States U-20 national team.

Shaw has represented the United States on the  under-17, under-19 and under-20 national teams, and was named U.S. Soccer Young Female Player of the Year in 2022.

Club career

Early career 
At the age of 15, Shaw was also invited to train with the French first-division club, Paris Saint-Germain. At the youth level, played for FC Dallas and Solar Soccer Club. In 2022, Shaw was rated as the second ranked top prospect for the high school class of 2023 by Top Drawer Soccer.

In spring 2022, she joined Washington Spirit for pre-season and was named in the club's initial preseason roaster.

San Diego Wave 
In July 2022, Shaw signed for NSWL club San Diego Wave after she was permitted to enter the NWSL through a discovery process which allowed for an amendment of the leagues age restrictions.

Thirteen days after signing with the club, on July 30, Shaw started the Waves' NSWL match against Chicago Red Stars. She became the second-youngest player to compete in NWSL at the age of 17 years, eight months. After scoring the game winner for her team in the 27th minute, she became the youngest NWSL player to score in their debut. Shaw went on to score goals against Washington Spirit, Angel City in September bringing her tally to three goals in three matches. She became the second player in NWSL history to score in each of their first three league appearances.

Born in 2004, Shaw is one of four NWSL players to be born in the 21st century. She finished off her first season with 3 goals in 7 matches.

International career 
Shaw was part of the U-15 team at the CONCACAF Girls' Under-15 Championship in 2018. She played a key role in helping the team to the title and winning the golden ball award as the best player of the tournament. She scored two goals in the final of the tournament leading the team to a 3–0 victory over Mexico.

In early 2020, Shaw became a starter for the U-20, where she scored two goals in three matches to help the squad to win the Sud Ladies Cup in Aubagne, France. Afterwards, Shaw was named to the USA U-20 roster for the 2022 FIFA U-20 Women's World Cup. She was one of two NWSL players to play for the U20 USWNT in the U20 World Cup.

Honours 
United States U15

 CONCACAF Girls' Under-15 Championship: 2018

United States U20

 Sud Ladies Cup: 2022

Individual

 CONCACAF Girls' Under-15 Championship Golden Ball: 2018
 Sud Ladies Cup Best XI: 2022
 US Soccer Young Female Player of the Year: 2022

References 

Living people
2004 births
American women's soccer players
United States women's under-20 international soccer players
San Diego Wave FC players
Women's association football forwards
National Women's Soccer League players
Women's association football midfielders